Portello may refer to:

 Portello (district of Milan), a car-producing district of Milan, Italy
 Portello (Milan Metro), an underground rail station
 Portello (soft drink), a type of fruit-flavored soft drink
 Portello Gate or Porta Ognissanti, in the walls of Padua, Italy